Kirmond le Mire is a small village and civil parish in the West Lindsey district of Lincolnshire, England. It is in the civil parish of Thoresway.

Kirmond le Mire Grade II listed Anglican church, built in 1847, is dedicated to St Martin.

The parish includes the lost Medieval settlement of Beckfield.

The village's name dates to at least 1086, soon after the Norman conquest of England. It is seen in the earliest historical documents as Chevremont-le-myrr, and in some later documents as Kevermond.

References

External links 

"Kirmond le Mire", Genuki.org.uk. Retrieved 21 April 2012

Villages in Lincolnshire
Civil parishes in Lincolnshire
West Lindsey District